The Crête Sèche is a mountain of the Mont Blanc massif, located south-west of Praz-de-Fort in the canton of Valais. It lies on the range east of the Grand Darray.

References

External links
 Crête Sèche on Hikr

Mountains of the Alps
Alpine three-thousanders
Mountains of Valais
Mountains of Switzerland